Inequalities are very important in the study of information theory.  There are a number of different contexts in which these inequalities appear.

Entropic inequalities

Consider a tuple  of  finitely (or at most countably) supported random variables on the same probability space. There are 2n subsets, for which (joint) entropies can be computed. They satisfy the following inequalities (which together characterize the range of the marginal and joint entropies of two random variables):
 
 
 
 
 
In fact, these can all be expressed as special cases of a single inequality involving the conditional mutual information, namely

Inequalities that can be derived as linear combinations of this are known as Shannon-type inequalities.

For larger  there are further restrictions on possible values of entropy.
The set of entropic vectors is denoted , following the notation of Yeung.

The set of all vectors that satisfy Shannon-type inequalities (but not necessarily other entropic inequalities) contains .
Zhang and Yeung reported the first non-Shannon-type inequality. 
Matus proved that no finite set of inequalities can characterize (by linear combinations) all entropic inequalities. In other words, the region  is not a polytope.

Lower bounds for the Kullback–Leibler divergence
A great many important inequalities in information theory are actually lower bounds for the Kullback–Leibler divergence.  Even the Shannon-type inequalities can be considered part of this category, since the interaction information can be expressed as the Kullback–Leibler divergence of the joint distribution with respect to the product of the marginals, and thus these inequalities can be seen as a special case of Gibbs' inequality.

On the other hand, it seems to be much more difficult to derive useful upper bounds for the Kullback–Leibler divergence.  This is because the Kullback–Leibler divergence DKL(P||Q) depends very sensitively on events that are very rare in the reference distribution Q.  DKL(P||Q) increases without bound as an event of finite non-zero probability in the distribution P becomes exceedingly rare in the reference distribution Q, and in fact DKL(P||Q) is not even defined if an event of non-zero probability in P has zero probability in Q.  (Hence the requirement that P be absolutely continuous with respect to Q.)

Gibbs' inequality

This fundamental inequality states that the Kullback–Leibler divergence is non-negative.

Kullback's inequality

Another inequality concerning the Kullback–Leibler divergence is known as Kullback's inequality.  If P and Q are probability distributions on the real line with P absolutely continuous with respect to Q, and whose first moments exist, then

The Cramér–Rao bound is a corollary of this result.

Pinsker's inequality

Pinsker's inequality relates Kullback–Leibler divergence and total variation distance.  It states that if P, Q are two probability distributions, then

 

where

 

is the Kullback–Leibler divergence in nats and

 

is the total variation distance.

Other inequalities

Hirschman uncertainty

This is especially significant since it implies, and is stronger than, Weyl's formulation of Heisenberg's uncertainty principle.

Tao's inequality

relating the conditional expectation to the conditional mutual information.  This is a simple consequence of Pinsker's inequality. (Note: the correction factor log 2 inside the radical arises because we are measuring the conditional mutual information in bits rather than nats.)

Machine based proof checker of information-theoretic inequalities
Several machine based proof checker algorithms are now available. Proof checker algorithms typically verify the inequalities as either true or false. More advanced proof checker algorithms can produce proof or counterexamples.ITIP is a Matlab based proof checker for all Shannon type Inequalities. Xitip is an open source, faster version of the same algorithm implemented in C with a graphical front end. Xitip also has a built in language parsing feature which support a broader range of random variable descriptions as input. AITIP and oXitip are cloud based implementations for validating the Shannon type inequalities. oXitip uses GLPK optimizer and has a C++ backend based on Xitip with a web based user interface. AITIP uses Gurobi solver for optimization and a mix of python and C++ in the backend implementation. It can also provide the canonical break down of the inequalities in terms of basic Information measures.

See also
Cramér–Rao bound
Entropy power inequality
Entropic vector
Fano's inequality
Jensen's inequality
Kraft inequality
Pinsker's inequality

References

External links
 Thomas M. Cover, Joy A. Thomas. Elements of Information Theory, Chapter 16, "Inequalities in Information Theory"  John Wiley & Sons, Inc. 1991 Print  Online  pdf
 Amir Dembo, Thomas M. Cover, Joy A. Thomas. Information Theoretic Inequalities. IEEE Transactions on Information Theory, Vol. 37, No. 6, November 1991. pdf
 ITIP: http://user-www.ie.cuhk.edu.hk/~ITIP/
 XITIP: http://xitip.epfl.ch
 N. R. Pai, Suhas Diggavi, T. Gläßle, E. Perron, R.Pulikkoonattu, R. W. Yeung, Y. Yan, oXitip: An Online Information Theoretic Inequalities Prover http://www.oxitip.com
 Siu Wai Ho, Lin Ling, Chee Wei Tan and Raymond W. Yeung, AITIP (Information Theoretic Inequality Prover): https://aitip.org
 Nivedita Rethnakar, Suhas Diggavi, Raymond. W. Yeung, InformationInequalities.jl: Exploring Information-Theoretic Inequalities, Julia Package, 2021 

 
Entropy and information
Information theory